Yevhen Hennadiyovych Pidlepenets (born 10 November 1998) is a Ukrainian professional footballer who plays as a right winger for Metalist Kharkiv.

Native of Tokmak, Pidlepenets is a product of the Zaporizhian Oblast flagman of football Metalurh originally, yet also of such clubs like Oleksandriya and Munkacs. In 2015–16 he competed for original Metalurh Zaporizhia reserve team in the UPL competitions for reserves (U-19) and following the club's bankruptcy for Oleksandriya reserve team. In 2017 the Zaporizhia city authorities restored Metalurh and he rejoined Metalurh Zaporizhia in amateur competitions. The club was readmitted to professional competitions in 2018 and Pidlepenets made his official debut at professional level on 22 July 2018 in the away match against FC Real Pharma Odesa. That season he played 20 regular league games as well as both play-off games. During the summer break Pidlepenets signed a contract with Deportivo La Coruna reserve team, Fabril, but did not stay there for too long. In 2020 he returned to Zaporizhia where only played 6 games and during the winter break signed with the revived Metalist Kharkiv, originally Metal Kharkiv.

At the Ukrainian Premier League Pidlepenets made his debut on the Ukrainian Independence Day (24 August) during the 2022–23 season when in the away match against FC Rukh Lviv he opened the match score.

References

External links
 Profile on Metalist Kharkiv official website
 
 

1998 births
Living people
People from Tokmak
Ukrainian footballers
Association football forwards
FC Metalurh Zaporizhzhia players
Deportivo Fabril players
FC Metalist Kharkiv players
Ukrainian Premier League players
Ukrainian First League players
Ukrainian Second League players
Tercera División players
Ukrainian expatriate footballers
Expatriate footballers in Spain
Ukrainian expatriate sportspeople in Spain
Sportspeople from Zaporizhzhia Oblast